The Chartered Institute of Ecology and Environmental Management (CIEEM) is the professional body which represents and supports ecologists and environmental managers, mainly in the United Kingdom but increasingly in Ireland and mainland Europe, and the rest of the world.

CIEEM's vision is of a healthy natural environment for the benefit of current and future generations.

Established in 1991, CIEEM now has over 6,000 members drawn from local authorities, government agencies, industry, environmental consultancy, teaching/research, and NGOs. Formerly known as IEEM, CIEEM attained a royal charter in 2013, being recognised for its high level of professionalism. The Inaugural President from 1991–94 was the ecologist Tony Bradshaw FRS.

Activities of CIEEM

CIEEM provides a variety of services (including conferences, training, events, guidance and advice) to develop the competency and standards of professional ecologists and environmental managers and also to promote ecology and environmental management as a profession.

CIEEM members are able to become Chartered Ecologists and/or Chartered Environmentalists.

CIEEM is a constituent body of the Society for the Environment and the Environmental Policy Forum (EPF). CIEEM is also a member of the IUCN-UK Committee and a supporter member of Greener UK.

CIEEM is a member of the UN Decade of Biodiversity 2011-2020 partnership, and was a signatory of the Countdown 2010 agreement to help save biodiversity and a member of the 2010 International Year of Biodiversity UK partnership.

Awards
The Institute makes a number of annual awards including:

CIEEM Medal

The CIEEM Medal is the Institute’s premier award and is presented in recognition of an outstanding single or lifelong contribution to the field of ecology and environmental management.

Best Practice Awards

Five best practice awards recognise the highest standards of ecological and environmental management practice by CIEEM members.

Tony Bradshaw Award

The Tony Bradshaw Award, named after the Institute's first president, recognises exceptional projects in the Best Practice Awards above.

Presidents
Source: CIEEM past presidents
2018–2021 – Max Wade
2015–2018 – Stephanie Wray 
2012–2015 – John Box
2010–2012 – Penny Anderson
2008–2010 – Steve Ormerod
2006–2008 – Andy Tasker
2004–2006 – Chris Spray
2002–2004 – Sue Bell
2000–2002 – David Hill
1997–2000 – David Parker
1994–1997 – David Goode
1991–1994 – Tony Bradshaw

See also
 Chartered Environmentalist
 List of environmental awards

References

External links
Chartered Institute of Ecology and Environmental Management
Society for the Environment
Environmental Policy Forum
2010 International Year of Biodiversity UK Partnership 
European Federation of Associations of Environmental Professionals
Europarc Federation
Eurosite
Countdown 2010
IUCN-UK Committee

Ecology organizations
Organisations based in Hampshire
Ecology
Science and technology in Hampshire
Winchester